Krasnorichenske, known as Kabannye until 1973, is an urban-type settlement in the Svatove Raion of the Luhansk Oblast of Ukraine. The population was estimated as

References

Urban-type settlements in Svatove Raion